This is a list of members of the Victorian Legislative Assembly, from the elections of 28 March 1889 to the elections of 20 April 1892. There were 95 seats in the Assembly from 1889, up from 86 in the previous Parliament.

The following districts were created or had new names in 1889: Albert Park, Anglesey, Benalla and Yarrawonga, Bogong, Borung, Carlton South, Clunes and Allandale, Dandenong and Berwick, Daylesford, Donald and Swan Hill, Dunolly, Eaglehawk, Eastern Suburbs, Essendon and Flemington, Gippsland Central, Gippsland East, Gippsland West, Gunbower, Hawthorn, Horsham, Jolimont and West Richmond, Kilmore, Dalhousie and Lancefield, Korong, Kyneton (renamed from Kyneton Boroughs), Lowan, Maryborough, Melbourne, Melbourne South, Numurkah and Nathalia, Polwarth, Port Fairy (renamed from Belfast), Port Melbourne (renamed from Sandridge), Prahran, Sandhurst South, Shepparton and Euroa, South Yarra, Talbot and Avoca, Toorak, Wangaratta and Rutherglen, Warrenheip, Windermere.

These districts were abolished before the 1889 elections: Avoca, Boroondara, Dalhousie, Kilmore and Anglesey, Maryborough and Talbot, Moira, Polwarth and South Grenville, South Bourke, Wimmera.

Victoria was a British self-governing colony in Australia at the time.

Note the "Term in Office" refers to that member's term(s) in the Assembly, not necessarily for that electorate.

Matthew Davies was Speaker, William McLellan was Chairman of Committees.

 Cheetham died 28 June 1890; replaced by William Tatchell sworn-in July 1890.
 Langridge died 24 March 1891, replaced by John Hancock, sworn-in June 1891.
 Russell died 17 October 1889; replaced by John Dunn, sworn-in November 1889.
 Stewart died 11 November 1889; replaced by Robert Bowman, sworn-in May 1890.
 Taylor is listed as member for Hawthorn in Hansard, but a newspaper report shows T. G. Atkinson won the election over Taylor.
 Wilkinson died 6 August 1891; replaced by Robert Harper, sworn-in September 1891.

References

Members of the Parliament of Victoria by term
19th-century Australian politicians